Patra is a census town in the  Udhwa CD block in the Rajmahal subdivision of the Sahibganj district in the Indian state of Jharkhand.

Geography

Location

Overview
Rajmahal coalfield is shown in the map. The entire area is overwhelmingly rural with only small pockets of urbanisation.

Note: The full screen map is interesting. All places marked on the map are linked and you can easily move on to another page of your choice. Enlarge the map to see what else is there – one gets railway links, many more road links and so on.

Demographics
According to the 2011 Census of India, Patra had a total population of 9,536, of which 4,845 (51%) were males and 4,691 (49%) were females. Population in the age range 0–6 years was 2,408. The total number of literate persons in Patra was 3,350 (47.00% of the population over 6 years).

Infrastructure
According to the District Census Handbook 2011, Sahibganj, Patra covered an area of 6.26 km2. Among the civic amenities, it had 10 km roads with open drains, the protected water supply involved hand pump, uncovered well. It had 141 domestic electric connections. Among the educational facilities it had 2 primary schools, 1 middle school, 2 secondary schools, 2 senior secondary schools. It had the branch offices of 1 nationalised bank, 1 cooperative bank.

References

Cities and towns in Sahibganj district